Songwriter is the thirteenth studio album by American singer/songwriter and record producer/arranger Richard Marx, released on September 30, 2022. The debut single "Same Heartbreak, Different Day" peaked at number 15 on the US Billboard Adult Contemporary chart.

Background
Songwriter features songs in the genres pop, rock and country, as well as ballads. For this album, Marx worked with many other songwriters, including his sons Lucas and Jesse, Keith Urban, Darius Rucker, Burt Bacharach, Richard Page, and Chris Daughtry among others.

Track listing

Personnel
Burt Bacharach – composer, producer
J. Blynn – electric guitars
Steve Brewster – drums
Topher Brown – writer
Paul Bushnell – bass
Cliff Colnot – string arrangement
Chris Daughtry – composer
Nina DiGregorio – violin
Shawn Fichter – drums
Josh Freese – drums
Brian Griffin – drums
Randy Houser – composer
Taylor Hawkins – drums
Mark Hill – bass
David Hodges – composer
Jillian Jacquline – harmony vocals
Michael Jade – composer, producer
Whynot Jansveld – mastering, bass guitar
Michael Landau – electric guitar, all guitars
Brice Long – composer
Jesse Marx – composer, producer, all instruments, background vocals
Lucas Marx – composer, producer, mixer, answer vocals, all instruments
Richard Marx – lead vocals, composer, producer, background vocals, all guitars, acoustic guitar, bass guitar, piano, keyboards, ganjo
Chip Matthews – mixing
Herman Matthews – drums
Jerry McPherson – guitars
Miles McPherson – drums
Adam Messinger – composer, producer, mixing, all instruments
Michael Omartian – string arrangement
Richard Page – composer
Greg Phillinganes – piano
Matthew Prock – engineer, mixing, mastering
Darius Rucker – writer
Matt Scannell – writer, producer, guitars, verse guitar, bass guitar
Keith Urban – writer
CJ Vanston – producer, mixing, all instruments
Jorge Vivo – recorder
Jason Wade – composer
Matt Walker – drums
Jason Webb – keyboards
Bruce Wiegner – composer, producer, mixing, all instruments

Charts

References

2022 albums
Richard Marx albums
Albums produced by Richard Marx
BMG Rights Management albums